Caldeirão com Mion, or simply Caldeirão, is a Brazilian variety show broadcast by TV Globo. Premiering on September 4, 2021, it is hosted by Marcos Mion, serving as a successor to Caldeirão do Huck.

History 
In June 2021, Globo announced that Fausto Silva had left the network, and that his long-running variety show Domingão do Faustão would be replaced by a new program hosted by Luciano Huck, who had hosted the Saturday-afternoon variety show Caldeirão do Huck.

In August 2021, Marcos Mion—who had previously been known for his tenure at MTV Brasil—signed with Globo to host programs on TV Globo and Multishow. Mion was named the new host of Caldeirão, with Globo initially considering the role to be an interim position. However, after strong ratings performance and critical reception, in October 2021  Mion was named the full-time host.

The show underwent a refresh in March 2022, including officially being re-titled Caldeirão com Mion, adding new mascot characters as assistants (a panda and Globinho), as well as the new segment Caldeirola.

Format and segments 
Some of the segments introduced upon its premiere included Isso a Globo Mostra (lit. "That Globo Show", where Mion highlights notable moments across Globo programs), and the song guessing game Sobe o Som. Only one segment from Huck's version of the show, Tem ou Não Tem (Family Feud), was maintained (most of Huck's game show segments moved along with him to Domingão com Huck).

Reception 
Mion's performance as host was widely praised on social media, with viewers commenting upon his energy and happiness on-air, and considering the program to be improved over Huck's tenure. In the IBOPE ratings, the series premiere of Caldeirão received an average rating of 15.9 rating points, and peaked at 20 points—surpassing the viewership of any edition of Caldeirão do Huck, and bringing Globo its highest average viewership on a Saturday since 2019. Its viewership remained steady in the months that followed, usually averaging around 13 points or higher in Greater São Paulo, and beating all other programs in its timeslot.

References 

TV Globo original programming
2021 Brazilian television series debuts
2020s Brazilian television series
Portuguese-language television shows